Midnight Son is the second studio album by Son Seals, released by Alligator Records in 1976. It was produced by Son Seals, Bruce Iglauer, and Richard McLeese.

Critical reception
AllMusic wrote that "the addition of a brisk horn section enhanced [Seal's] staccato guitar attack and uncompromising vocals."

Track listing
"I Believe" – 4:15
"No, No Baby" – 4:30
"Four Full Seasons of Love" – 2:50
"Telephone Angel" – 5:27
"Don't Bother Me" – 3:52
"On My Knees" – 4:59
"Don't Fool with My Baby" – 3:04
"Strung Out Woman" – 3:45
"Going Back Home" – 7:04

Personnel
 Son Seals - Guitar, Vocals
 Steve Plair - Guitar
 Harry Mitchum - Bass
 Bert Robinson - Drums
 Alberto Gianquinto - Keyboards
 Bill McFarland - Trombone
 Kenneth Cooper - Trumpet

References

External links
Alligator.com

1976 albums
Son Seals albums
Albums produced by Bruce Iglauer
Alligator Records albums